Professional Services Inc. operating as The Medical City (TMC) is a health institution in the Philippines which maintains a network of hospitals and clinics in the Philippines. The TMC also maintains the Guam Regional Medical City in Guam and a network of clinics in the Gulf states.

History
The main hospital of The Medical City opened as the ABM Sison Hospital in 1967 with a change of hospital management occurring in 1969.The health facility was renamed as "The Medical City" or TMC in 1975.

In 1996, the first outpatient clinic was opened in Antipolo, Rizal. The main hospital moved to its current location in Ortigas in 2004. The TMC launched the Center for Patient Partnership, its flagship patient partnership program in 2007.

TMC began aggressively expanding its presence by acquiring hospitals and clinics outside Metro Manila and in the Visayas and Mindanao as well in the early 2010s.

A boardroom coup happened in September 2018, which led to CEO Alfredo Bengzon losing control of TMC. His nephew Jose Xavier Gonzales was elected as Chairperson and Eugenio Ramos was elected as CEO in a special stockholders meeting. The move was legally challenged by Bengzon with the Gonzales-Ramos side insisting Bengzon's tenure has expired and that he has less than 1 percent stakes in the company. Another election was held electing Gonzales and Ramos to the TMC's board The Securities and Exchange Commission ordered TMC in August 2020 to revert its board composition as of 2013, potentially restoring Bengzon as CEO ruling that the 2018 leadership change as illegal.

During the 2020 COVID-19 pandemic in the Philippines, the TMC has accommodated patients at its main hospital in Ortigas. By April 2020, the hospital is already among the COVID-19 testing centers in the country and the TMC has entered partnership with the local governments of Pasig and Valenzuela; with the former to convert the Pasig City Children's Hospital to a COVID-19 dedicated facility and with the latter for their mass testing efforts.

Facilities

The hospital's main facility is located on a 1.5-hectare property along Ortigas Avenue, almost within the business district of Ortigas Center in Pasig, Metro Manila.

TMC also serves as the hub for a network of satellite clinics and hospitals that delivers a range of diagnostic and therapeutic services to patients in Manila and select provinces.

It also operates the Guam Regional Medical City, the first private hospital in Guam as well as clinics in the Gulf Cooperation Council countries.

In 2021, TMC entered in a partnership with Ascent enabling it to transport patients, medical personnel, and sensitive cargo between TMC's hospitals and Ascent's hubs using Ascent's on-demand helicopter services.

Hospitals
The Medical City Ortigas – Pasig
The Medical City Clark – Clark Freeport Zone (Mabalacat)
The Medical City Iloilo – Iloilo City
The Medical City Pangasinan – Dagupan
The Medical City South Luzon – Santa Rosa, Laguna
Guam Regional Medical City – Dededo, Guam

References

External links
 

Medical and health organizations based in the Philippines
1967 establishments in the Philippines
Hospital networks in the Philippines